Greenville is a city in and the county seat of Darke County, Ohio, United States, located near the western edge of Ohio about 33 miles northwest of Dayton. The population was 13,227 at the 2010 census.

History
Historic Native American tribes in the region included the Wyandot, the Delaware, the Shawnee, the Ottawa, the Chippewa, the Pottawatomi, the Miami, the Weea, the Kickapoo, the Piankasha, the Kaskaskia and the Eel River tribe. These participated in the Northwest Indian War, their effort to repel European Americans from the Northwest Territory.

Greenville is the historic location of Fort Greene Ville, which was built in November 1793 by General Anthony Wayne's Legion of the United States during the Northwest Indian War. The fort was a training ground and base of operations for the ~3000 soldiers of the Legion and Kentucky Milia prior to their march northward in August 1794 to the Battle of Fallen Timbers. A year after the battle, the Treaty of Greenville was signed at the fort on August 3, 1795, with chiefs of the tribes that had confronted the US. This brought an end to the Indian wars in the area and opened the Northwest Territory for European-American settlement. 

Fort Greenville was abandoned by the Army in 1796; it was partly burned later that year to retrieve nails used in its construction. Some of its logs were carried away by local settlers to be reused in building the new settlement of Dayton, Ohio to the south. In the War of 1812, what remained of the fort was refitted by the Army; it was used as a supply depot and staging area. The earliest European-American settlers came in 1807; the city of Greenville was officially founded in August 1808.

Geography
Greenville is located at  (40.102474, -84.627985).

Local airports include Darke County Airport, seven miles away in Versailles and James M. Cox Dayton International Airport 35 miles away in Vandalia.

Attractions 
Greenville hosts The Great Darke County Fair, which runs annually for nine days in August. 

Built in 1849, the historic Bear's Mill is an example of a stonegrinding flour mill of its time. Placed on the National Register of Historic Places in 1977, it is used today to grind cornmeal, whole-wheat flour, rye flour, and pancake mixes. The mill and the buhr stones are powered by water. Self-guided tours may be taken during regular business hours.

Greenville has a local history museum, the Garst Museum, which features the most extensive known collections of memorabilia of Annie Oakley and Lowell Thomas, both of whom were born nearby. It also holds historical artifacts relating to Anthony Wayne and the Treaty of Greenville, as well as Native American artifacts. 

The museum also includes a village of shops; a wing of early American furnishings, pioneer life, and military uniforms; an early Indianapolis 500 race car built in Greenville; and an extensive genealogy room for research. Also located in Greenville is St. Clair Memorial Hall, the center for the arts in Darke County. This structure, built in 1910, has been completely remodeled and is a showpiece for all of Darke County.

The city and surrounding areas are served by a daily newspaper published in Greenville, The Daily Advocate.

Notable companies

Various companies and brands such as KitchenAid and BASF North America have offices in Greenville.

Demographics

2010 census
As of the census of 2010, there were 13,227 people, 5,933 households, and 3,430 families living in the city. The racial makeup of the city was 96.7% White, 0.9% African American, 0.2% Native American, 0.7% Asian, 0.3% from other races, and 1.1% from two or more races. Hispanic or Latino of any race were 1.4% of the population.

There were 5,933 households, of which 26.3% had children under the age of 18 living with them, 41.2% were married couples living together, 12.0% had a female householder with no husband present, 4.7% had a male householder with no wife present, and 42.2% were non-families. 37.5% of all households were made up of individuals, and 19.4% had someone living alone who was 65 years of age or older. The average household size was 2.17, and the average family size was 2.83.

The median age in the city was 43.4 years. 21.5% of residents were under the age of 18; 8.4% were between the ages of 18 and 24; 21.8% were from 25 to 44; 25.6% were from 45 to 64, and 22.5% were 65 years of age or older. The gender makeup of the city was 46.0% male and 54.0% female.

2000 census
As of the census of 2000, there were 13,294 people, 5,649 households, and 3,462 families living in the city. The population density was 2,206.4 people per square mile (851.2/km2). There were 6,030 housing units at an average density of 1,000.8 per square mile (386.1/km2). The racial makeup of the city was 97.31% White, 0.56% African American, 0.17% Native American, 0.53% Asian, 0.02% Pacific Islander, 0.44% from other races, and 0.97% from two or more races. Hispanic or Latino of any race were 1.14% of the population.

There were 5,649 households, out of which 27.3% had children living with them, 46.5% were married couples living together, 11.0% had a female householder with no husband present, and 38.7% were non-families. 34.4% of all households were made up of individuals, and 16.9% had someone living alone who was 65 years of age or older. The average household size was 2.23, and the average family size was 2.85.

In the city, the population was spread out, with 22.7% under the age of 18, 8.3% from 18 to 24, 25.4% from 25 to 44, 20.9% from 45 to 64, and 22.7% who were 65 years of age or older. The median age was 40 years. For every 100 females, there were 84.1 males. For every 100 females age 18 and over, there were 78.6 males.

The median income for a household in the city was $31,791, and the median income for a family was $38,699. Males had a median income of $33,143 versus $24,875 for females. The per capita income for the city was $18,830. About 10.2% of families and 13.4% of the population were below the poverty line, including 18.8% of those under age 18 and 14.6% of those age 65 or over.

Notable people
Jack Baldschun, baseball player
Jeffrey D. Feltman, United Nations diplomat
Ray Hathaway, baseball player
Matt Light, American football player
Clayton Murphy, Olympian
Paul Norris, comic book artist
Annie Oakley, American sharpshooter
Bob Peebles, Scottish-American professional golfer
Gene Riegle, harness racing driver and trainer
Lowell Thomas, writer and broadcaster
Jim Van Bebber, film director
Rick Macci, tennis coach

References

External links

 City website
 
  archaeological preservation of Fort Greenville

 
Cities in Ohio
Cities in Darke County, Ohio
1795 establishments in the Northwest Territory
County seats in Ohio
Populated places established in 1795